This page is an overview of the Netherlands at the World Single Distance Championships.

List of medalists

Medal table

Medals by discipline

Medals by championships

Medals by skater
Including team pursuit, after 2023 World Single Distances Speed Skating Championships

Men

Women

World Speed Skating Championships
Speed skating in the Netherlands